Absorbance Units Full Scale (AUFS) is a ubiquitous unit of UV absorbance intensity.

Usage

AUFS is an arbitrary but ubiquitous unit of UV absorbance intensity.  It can be used in chemical analysis to quantify components in a mixture, as each components' integrated peak area correspond to their relative abundance.

Application areas
 Analytical chemistry
 Chromatography

See also

 Spectroscopy

References

External links
 http://definedmeaning.com/meaning-of/6665/aufs-means-what-does-aufs-mean

Analytical chemistry
Chromatography